Annales Botanici Fennici is a bimonthly peer-reviewed scientific journal covering the systemics, taxonomy, and nomenclature of fungi and plants. The journal also accepts articles on population biology, physiology, molecular biology, climate change, ecology and invasive species, phytogeography, and paleoecology.

History 
Annales Botanici Fennici was founded by the Societas Biologica Fennica Vanamo in 1964. It replaced two previous series which had been in circulation from 1923 to 1963 called Annales Botanici Societatis Zoologicae Fennicae Vanamo and Archivum Societatis Zoologicae Fennicae Vanamo. The Annales series ran for a total of 35 volumes, while the Archivum ran for 18. 

From 1978 to 1994 it was then published by the Finnish Botanical Publishing Board. In 1980, the journal Acta Botanica Fennica was split off from the Annales. The purpose of the Acta was to print longer, more comprehensive monographs at least 64 pages long which did not fit into the short quarterly format of the Annales. Acta was in print until 2009.

The Finnish Botanical Publishing Board became the Finnish Zoological and Botanical Publishing Board in 1994 and has continued to publish the journal since then. The journal is now sponsored by the Finnish Ministry of Education and Culture.

Beginning in 2022, the journal moved to an online-only format starting with its 59th volume.

Editorial process 
Annales Botanici Fennici is directed by an editor-in-chief. Other members of an Editorial Board also assist in compiling the journal. The first editor of the journal was Rauno Ruuhijärvi. When publishing responsibilities shifted to the Finnish Botanical Publishing Board in 1978 for the journal's 15th volume, an Advisory Board was established consisting of a dozen members with auxiliary roles in the journal's production. All manuscripts submitted to the journal are reviewed by two "referees" selected at random from the editorial board before publication.

References 

Publications established in 1964
Nature Research academic journals
Bimonthly journals
English-language journals
Botany journals